William Louis of Nassau-Dillenburg (13 March 1560, Dillenburg, Hesse – 13 July 1620, Leeuwarden, Netherlands) was Count of Nassau-Dillenburg from 1606 to 1620, and stadtholder of Friesland, Groningen, and Drenthe.

Life 
William Louis was the eldest son of John VI, Count of Nassau-Dillenburg and his first wife, Elisabeth of Leuchtenberg.

He served as a cavalry officer under William the Silent. Together with his cousin (and brother-in-law) Maurice of Nassau, Prince of Orange, he commanded the Dutch States Army and helped plan the military strategy of the Dutch Republic against Spain from 1588 to 1609.

William Louis played a significant part in the Military Revolution of the 16th–17th centuries. In a letter to his cousin Maurice of Nassau, Prince of Orange which he composed on 8 December 1594, he set out (from reading Aelianus Tacticus) an argument based on the use of ranks by soldiers of Imperial Rome as discussed in Aelian's Tactica. Aelian was discussing the use of the counter march in the context of the Roman sword gladius and spear pilium. William Louis in a 'crucial leap' realized that the same technique could work for men with firearms.

" I have discovered evolutionibus [a term that would eventually be translated as "drill"] a method of getting the musketeers and others with guns not only to practice firing but to keep on doing so in a very effective battle order (that is to say, they do not fire at will or from behind a  Just as soon as the first rank has fired, then by the drill [they have learned] they will march to the back.  The second rank either marching forward or standing still, will then fire just like the first. After that the third and following ranks will do the same. When the last rank has fired, the first will have reloaded, as the following diagram 

On 25 November 1587, he married his cousin, Anna of Nassau, daughter of William the Silent and Anna of Saxony, and older sister of Maurice of Nassau.  Anna died less than six months later on 13 June 1588, and William Louis never remarried.

He was nicknamed "Us Heit" (West Frisian for "our father"). He died in his home, the Stadhouderlijk hof in Leeuwarden, the city which honored him with a statue on the government square. His body was laid to rest in the Grote of Jacobijnerkerk.

Ancestors

References

External links
  
 
 

|-

|-

|-

1560 births
1620 deaths
People from Dillenburg
Dutch stadtholders
Dutch people of the Eighty Years' War (United Provinces)
German Calvinist and Reformed Christians
House of Nassau
Counts of Nassau
17th-century Dutch military personnel